Hamilton South is one of the 20 electoral wards of South Lanarkshire Council. Created in 2007, the ward elects four councillors using the single transferable vote electoral system and covers an area with a population of 22,032 people.

The ward has produced strong results for both the Scottish National Party (SNP) – who won half the seats at the 2012, 2017 and 2022 elections – and Labour who won half the seats at the 2007, 2012 and 2022 elections. Following a by-election win in 2013, Labour held three of the four seats.

Boundaries
The ward was created following the Fourth Statutory Reviews of Electoral Arrangements ahead of the 2007 Scottish local elections. As a result of the Local Governance (Scotland) Act 2004, local elections in Scotland would use the single transferable vote electoral system from 2007 onwards so Hamilton South was formed from an amalgamation of several previous first-past-the-post wards. It contained all of the former Low Waters and Silvertonhill wards as well as part of the former Cadzow and Woodhead/Meikle Earnock wards and a small part of the former Hamilton Centre/Ferniegair and Hamilton Centre North wards. Hamilton South covers the southern part of Hamilton including the Avon Grove, Cadzow, Eddlewood, Fairhill, Laighstonehall, Low Waters, Meikle Earnock, Silvertonhill, Torhead Farm and Woodhead neighbourhoods. Following the Fifth Statutory Reviews of Electoral Arrangements ahead of the 2017 Scottish local elections, streets around Portland Place, Burnblea Street and Kemp Street were added to the ward from Hamilton North and East which resulted in the ward's northeastern boundary moving to the Argyle Line railway tracks.

Councillors

Election results

2022 election

2017 election

2015 by-election

2013 by-election

2012 election

2007 election

Notes

References

Wards of South Lanarkshire
Hamilton, South Lanarkshire